Andriy Semyankiv is a Ukrainian writer.

In December 2022 he won the BBC News' Ukraine Book Award for his medical thriller Dancing With Bones. He received the news while on the frontlines of the Russian invasion of Ukraine, where he serves as a field medic.

References 

Ukrainian writers
Year of birth missing (living people)
Living people